Friedrichstadt was an Amt ("collective municipality") in the district of Nordfriesland, in Schleswig-Holstein, Germany. Its seat was in Friedrichstadt. In January 2008, it (with the exception of the town Friedrichstadt) was merged with the Ämter Hattstedt, Nordstrand and Treene to form the Amt Nordsee-Treene.

The Amt Friedrichstadt consisted of the following municipalities:

Drage 
Friedrichstadt
Koldenbüttel 
Seeth
Uelvesbüll 
Witzwort

Former Ämter in Schleswig-Holstein